"Dinero" is a song by American singer Trinidad Cardona, originally released on June 21, 2017, by Citi U.S., before being edited and reissued on February 2, 2018, by Island Records. It was produced by D'Mile and Willstrumentals. The song did not gain significant attention until 2021, when it went viral on video sharing app TikTok, subsequently charting across Europe.

Background
Cardona initially recorded several songs in 2017, including "Dinero" and the viral hit "Jennifer", before he was signed to Island Records. After his first two albums failed to gain any substantial success, Island dropped Cardona in 2018, after which he began working odd jobs while "remaining hopeful about his music career". While working as a food delivery driver in early 2021, Cardona wrote down on a vision board that he wanted to go viral on TikTok: "Don't know how, don't know what. And boom, manifestations." Two months later, his family alerted him that "Dinero" was going viral on TikTok, appearing in several dance challenges. Dinero later re-signed with Island based on the success of the track.

Charts

Weekly charts

Year-end charts

Certifications

References

2017 singles
2017 songs
2018 singles
Songs written by D'Mile